The 1996–97 Coppin State Eagles men's basketball team represented Coppin State University during the 1996–97 NCAA Division I men's basketball season. The Eagles, led by 11th year head coach Fang Mitchell, played their home games at the Coppin Center and were members of the Mid-Eastern Athletic Conference. They finished the season 22–9, 15–3 in MEAC play to win the conference regular season title. The Eagles then went on to win the MEAC tournament title to receive an automatic bid to the NCAA tournament as No. 15 seed in the East region. In the opening round, Coppin State became the third No. 15 seed to win an NCAA Tournament game, and the first to do so by double digits, as they defeated No. 2 seed South Carolina 78–65. The Eagles narrowly missed out on becoming the first No. 15 seed to reach the Sweet Sixteen when they lost in the second round to No. 10 seed Texas, 82–81.

Roster

Schedule and results

|-
!colspan=9 style=| Regular season

|-
!colspan=9 style=| MEAC tournament

|-
!colspan=9 style=| NCAA tournament

References

1996-97
1996–97 Mid-Eastern Athletic Conference men's basketball season
1997 NCAA Division I men's basketball tournament participants
1996 in sports in Maryland
1997 in sports in Maryland